Schuh (pronounced //, like "shoe") is a Scottish footwear retailer based in Livingston, Scotland. It has 132 stores in the United Kingdom and Ireland. The company is predominantly a branded shoe stockist, selling over 80 brands, including: Converse, Vans, UGG, Nike, Adidas as well as its own Schuh label.

History

The very first Schuh store opened on Edinburgh’s North Bridge Arcade in 1981. Schuh’s founder Sandy Alexander noticed a lack of fashionable footwear retailer outside London, and he chose Edinburgh to open the very first Schuh store.
The business was operating independently until 1986, when it was acquired by Goldbergs. It continued as a semi-autonomous trading division until it regained independence through a management buy-out in 1990 and Schuh Ltd. was formed.

In June 2011, Schuh was acquired by Genesco footwear retailer, for the sum of £125 million.

Schuh is German for shoe. In external marketing, the company pronounces the word like the English word "shoe". Because of the name, many people assume that schuh is a German company. Schuh was to be originally named Lizard, until founder Sandy Alexander's colleague Mike Doherty saw the word ‘schuhe’ written at the top of an industry magazine - they dropped the 'e' and "schuh" was born.

Timeline

 1981: opened first store on Edinburgh’s North Bridge Arcade
 1983: schuh opens in Glasgow
 1984: First English store opens in Newcastle
 1990: Business is restructured and a new management team is established
 1991: schuh HQ moves to Livingston 
 1992: schuh opens second store in Edinburgh and Glasgow along with Aberdeen and Newcastle
 1994: New stores in Nottingham, Leeds, Hull, Liverpool and Manchester
 1997: schuh opens first Ireland store in Dublin
 2004: opened first London store at 200 Oxford Street
 2008: 2nd London store opens in the Westfield London development
 2009: The schuh welly exchange appears at 5 UK festivals and wins a UK Festival award for Best Brand Activation.
 2010: Opens a ‘hometown’ store in Livingston
 2012: schuh is acquired by US corporation Genesco 
 2012: schuh kids is launched
 2015: schuh opens its first stores outside of the UK and Republic of Ireland in the Centro shopping centre in Oberhausen, Germany.

Company Info
schuh HQ and distribution centre is in Livingston, Scotland with a Press Office and design studio in London. schuh trades profitably from their 100+ high street stores and their website. schuh had a turnover of £233 million in 2012/2013 generating a profit of £25.6 million.

The company has a fully responsive site with a strong emphasis on "mobile first approach".

schuh Kids
2012 saw the launch of : the first expansion of the schuh brand since the company was acquired by Genesco in June 2011.

Since launch, the  store concept has proved extremely popular, receiving industry recognition with a POPAI interiors award in 2013. schuh kids is now available in all stores as well as online.

Products
schuh is predominantly a branded footwear stockist selling popular brands like Converse, Adidas, Vans, Nike and UGG Australia as well as less known and more niche brands, and also the schuh own brand label which are designed by an in-house team of shoe designers. The schuh brand aspires to represent current fashion looks and trends. Besides footwear schuh also stocks shoe care products and accessories.

schuh Magazine
Launched in 1998, the schuh magazine was distributed through its stores with cover stars include Caprice, Katie Price and Gail Porter. The magazine was produced by the head office and combined features on the company and its footwear along with music and other pop culture subjects. The final schuh magazine was released in 2006.

schuh Welly Exchange
In 2009 schuh launched the schuh Welly Exchange at Scotland’s RockNess Festival. The schuh Welly Exchange swaps festival goers old shoes for wellington boots. The shoes are recycled by the Newlife Foundation. The schuh Welly Exchange has appeared at Bestival, Oxegen, Camp Bestival, Global Gathering, Creamfields, Summer Sundae and RockNess.

schuh Design Challenge
In partnership with West Lothian Council, schuh launched the schuh Design Challenge in 1997. It has run every year since and is aimed at promoting fashion design in schools located near its head office in Livingston.

Recent awards

 Winner: Scottish Fashion Awards 2013
 Winner: Gold Award in Flagship and Store category 2013
 Winner: Drapers Footwear Awards: Multiple Footwear Retailer of the Year 2013
 Winner: Insider Deals: Dealmaker Deal of the year 2012
 Winner: Insider deals: Dealmaker Sale of the year 2012
 Winner: Fabulous Magazine: Fabulous for stand-alone shoes 2012
 Winner: Company high fashion awards: Best footwear under £150 2012
 Winner: Drapers footwear & accessories awards: High street retailer of the year 2012
 Winner: Retail Week Rising Star Awards: Customer Service Team of the Year 2011
 Winner: Drapers Footwear Awards: Multiple Footwear Retailer of the Year 2011 winners
 Winner: Drapers Footwear Awards: Multiple Footwear Retailer of the Year 2010
 Winner: Drapers Footwear Awards: Etailer of the Year 2010
 Winner: Drapers Etail Awards: Drapers Best Multichannel Retailer 2010
 Winner: Drapers Footwear Awards: Young Fashion Footwear Retailer of the Year 2009
 Winner: Drapers Footwear Awards: Men’s Footwear Retailer of the Year 2009
 Winner: Drapers Etail Awards: Best Multichannel Retailer 2009
 Winner: UK Festival Awards: Best Brand activation 2009
 Winners' Sponsor: Lux Style Awards in Pakistan

References

External links
 Schuh website - UK
 Schuh website - Ireland

Retail companies established in 1981
Shoe companies of the United Kingdom
Companies based in West Lothian
Scottish brands
1981 establishments in Scotland
Clothing retailers of Scotland
2012 mergers and acquisitions
Footwear retailers
British subsidiaries of foreign companies
Livingston, West Lothian